A statue of Christopher Columbus is installed in Wilkes-Barre, Pennsylvania, United States. The monument was vandalized multiple times in 2020.

See also

 List of monuments and memorials to Christopher Columbus

References

Buildings and structures in Luzerne County, Pennsylvania
Monuments and memorials in Pennsylvania
Monuments and memorials to Christopher Columbus
Outdoor sculptures in Pennsylvania
Sculptures of men in Pennsylvania
Statues in Pennsylvania
Wilkes-Barre
Vandalized works of art in Pennsylvania
Wilkes-Barre, Pennsylvania